The Nüenchamm is a mountain of the Glarus Alps, overlooking the Walensee in the canton of Glarus. It is located west of the Mürtschenstock, between the Linth valley and the valley of the Talalpsee.

References

External links
Nüenchamm on Hikr

Mountains of the Alps
Mountains of Switzerland
Mountains of the canton of Glarus
One-thousanders of Switzerland